Syndassko is a small settlement in Taymyrsky Dolgano-Nenetsky District, Krasnoyarsk Krai in Russia with a population of 553 inhabitants.

References

Rural localities in Krasnoyarsk Krai
Taymyrsky Dolgano-Nenetsky District